Villeneuve-la-Lionne is a commune in the Marne department in north-eastern France.

It is the site of the former Belleau Abbey, now used as a church

See also
Communes of the Marne department

References

Villeneuvelalionne